Group Therapy (released on CD as Art Farmer's New York Jazz Sextet) is an album by Art Farmer's New York Jazz Sextet recorded in 1965 and 1966 and originally released on the Scepter label.

The Lone Hill Jazz CD reissue includes both mono and stereo versions. The stereo versions seem to have been mastered from a stereo LP and are poorly banded.

Reception

Ken Dryden of Allmusic states, "Art Farmer fans will want to pick up this valuable reissue, especially since this represents the sole recording by this short-lived sextet".

Track listing
 "Signature" (Tom McIntosh) - 0:10    
 "Bottom on Top" (McIntosh) - 5:32    
 "Supplication" (Adolph Sandole) - 5:26    
 "Another Look" (Adolph Sandole) - 7:31    
 "Dim After Day" (Dennis Sandole) - 6:42    
 "Indian Summer" (Victor Herbert) - 4:32    
 "Joy Shout" (Dennis Sandole) - 4:37    
 "Giant Steps" (John Coltrane) - 3:41

Personnel
Art Farmer - flugelhorn
Tom McIntosh - trombone
James Moody - tenor saxophone, flute
Patti Bown (track 8 & 16), Tommy Flanagan (tracks 1-7) - piano
Richard Davis (tracks 1-7), Reggie Workman (track 8) - bass
Albert Heath - drums
Marie Volpee - vocals (track 8)

References 

Scepter Records albums
Art Farmer albums
1966 albums